Meerut Teachers constituency is one of 100 Legislative Council seats in Uttar Pradesh. This constituency comes under Bulandshahar, Ghaziabad, Gautambuddhnagar, Bagpat, Meerut, Muzaffarnagar and Saharanpur districts.

Members of Legislative Council
1974 Om Prakash Sharma (Teacher) Independent
1980 Om Prakash Sharma (Teacher) Independent
1986 Om Prakash Sharma (Teacher) Independent
1992 Om Prakash Sharma (Teacher) Independent
1998 Om Prakash Sharma (Teacher) Independent
2004 Om Prakash Sharma (Teacher) Independent 
2010 Om Prakash Sharma (Teacher) Independent 
2014 Om Prakash Sharma (Teacher) Independent 
2020 Sri Chand Sharma (Teacher) BJP

Term of tenure
Retirement after 6 years.

Political Party View
Non political party view

See also
Meerut (Assembly constituency)
Meerut (Lok Sabha constituency)

References

 http://eci.nic.in/eci_main1/current/PN_051004.pdf 
 http://upvidhanparishad.nic.in/dalwaqr%20sadasya.htm
 http://myneta.info/upmlc/candidate.php?candidate_id=62

Uttar Pradesh Legislative Council
Teachers constituencies in India